Anchorage tram stop is on the Eccles Line of Greater Manchester's light rail Metrolink system, in the Salford Quays area, in North West England. It opened on 12 June 1999 as part of Phase 2 of the system's expansion. The Anchorage name is a reference to The Anchorage building alongside, a large office block built at the end of Salford's former Dock 9 in 1991, sometime before the tram's arrival.

Services

Service pattern
6 minute service to Ashton under Lyne (peak) 12 minute service at off-peak times
12 minute service to MediaCityUK (peak).
12 minute service to Eccles (via MediaCityUK at off-peak times & Sunday's)

Connecting bus routes
Anchorage tram stop is served by Diamond Bus North West services 29, 73 & 79, Go North West Orbits 53, travelling between Cheetham Hill & Salford Shopping Centre and Stagecoach Manchester service 50, linking Salford Shopping Centre in Pendleton, Salford Crescent railway station, Salford University, Salford Central railway station, Manchester and East Didsbury with Salford Quays and MediaCityUK.

References

External links
Anchorage Stop Information
Anchorage area map

Tram stops in Salford
Tram stops on the Eccles to Piccadilly line
Tram stops on the MediaCityUK to Cornbrook line
Salford Quays